Anak Mindanao also known as AMIN Partylist is a party-list in the Philippines, based in Mindanao.

Anak Mindanao was established in 1997. It seek representation of Mindanaoans.

In the 2004 elections for the House of Representatives the party-list got 269,750 votes (2.1204% of the Philippine vote) and one seat (Mujiv Hataman). In the May 14, 2007 election, the party won 1 seat in the nationwide party-list vote.

Electoral performance

2004 election result in Mindanao
Zamboanga Peninsula: 31,744 votes, 9.4201%
Northern Mindanao: 66,512 votes, 9.2306%
Davao Region: 3,830 votes, 0.6634%
Soccsksargen: 7,755 votes, 1.2371%
Caraga: 1,451 votes, 0.4648%
Autonomous Region in Muslim Mindanao: 147,539 votes, 18.8769%
Source:

References

Local political parties in the Philippines
Party-lists represented in the House of Representatives of the Philippines
Regionalist parties
Regionalist parties in the Philippines
1997 establishments in the Philippines